Rededey, Rededya or Ridada (died 1022) was a prince of Kassogia, a Circassian tribe from the North Caucasus.

History 

The Laurentian Codex provides the following information. In 1022, Prince Mstislav the Brave, who at the time was the prince of Tmutarakan, started a military operation against the Alans. During the operation, he encountered the Kassogian army commanded by Rededya. To avoid unnecessary bloodshed, Mstislav and Rededya, who possessed an extraordinary physical strengh, decided to have a personal fight, with the condition that the winner would be considered the winner of the battle. The fight lasted some hours and, eventually, Rededya was knocked to the ground and stabbed with a knife. The subjects of Rededya were forced to admit defeat. Mstislav ascribed his win to the Virgin, whom he prayed to before the battle.

Subsequently, Mstislav has taken the wife and the two sons of Rededya and had them baptized. In their baptism, Rededya's sons got the names of Yury and Roman. Roman later married Tatyana, the daughter of Mstislav.

Traditionally, Kassogians are considered as direct ancestors of the Circassians. Some modern Russian pseudo-historians claimed they may have come to the Caucasus from the Middle East and subsequently assimilated.

Notes

1022 deaths
Circassian nobility
Year of birth unknown